Magdalena Klatka (born 7 May 1997 in Oświęcim, Poland) is a Polish pair skater. With partner Radosław Chruściński, she is a two-time (2011–2012) Polish national champion.

Programs 
(with Chruściński)

Competitive highlights 
(with Chruściński)

References

External links 

 

Polish female pair skaters
1997 births
Living people
People from Oświęcim
Sportspeople from Lesser Poland Voivodeship